Xin Lu  is a Professor of Cancer Biology and Director of the Ludwig Institute for Cancer Research at the University of Oxford.  She is known for her discovery of and research on the ASPP family of proteins.

Education 
Xin Lu completed her undergraduate education in Biochemistry at Sichuan University in 1982 and her masters degree in Cell and Molecular Biology at the Cancer Institute, Peking Union Medical College & Chinese Academy of Medical Sciences in 1985. She moved to University College London (UCL) to complete her PhD studies supervised by Birgit Lane, and published her thesis A study of intermediate filament formation using retrovirus-mediated gene transfer in 1991.

Research and Career 
In 1993, after a short postdoc with David Lane at Dundee University, she joined the Ludwig Institute for Cancer Research (LICR), which was based at St Mary's Hospital, Imperial College London and set up her own research group. In 2004 Lu was appointed Director of Research at Ludwig Institute for Cancer Research London Branch, and Professor of Cancer Biology at University College London. In 2007 she moved the institute to Oxford.

Honours and awards 
 Fellow of the Royal Society, (2020).
 Fellow of the Academy of Medical Sciences (2013)
 Member of the European Molecular Biology Organization (2011)
 Fellow of the Royal Society of Biology (2011)
 Fellow of the Royal College of Pathologists (2007)

Notable works

References 

Year of birth missing (living people)
Living people
Cancer researchers
Sichuan University alumni
Peking Union Medical College alumni
Alumni of Imperial College London
Female Fellows of the Royal Society